Steyerberg is a municipality in the district of Nienburg, in Lower Saxony, Germany. It is situated approximately 15 km southwest of Nienburg, and 30 km north of Minden.

References

Nienburg (district)